Ralstonia pseudosolanacearum is a soil-borne bacterium. It is a vascular phytopathogen that infects host plants through the root system causing wilting disease that causes loss in a wide range of crops. R. pseudosolanacearum is Gram negative and was originally identified as Ralstonia solanacearum, however, in 2014 Safni et al. proposed a taxonomic revision of the Ralstonia solanacearum species complex to reclassify phylotype strains, including R. pseudosolanacearum (R. solanacearum Phylotype I and III). 

R. pseudosolanacearum has been reported in a wide variety of crops including ornamental roses (Rosa sp.), tomato (Solanum lycopersicum), sweet pepper (Capsicum annum) and eggplant (Solanum melongena).  Recent studies have found significant differences in disease severity influenced by higher temperatures (28°C) indicating temperature may be a virulence factor upon host colonization. The same study also reported wound inoculation resulted in higher disease severity regardless of temperatures tested (20°C -vs- 28°C) in addition to potential implications of latent infections.

Genetics (Strain Tg03) 
 Median GC content: 66.9327%
 Genome size (Mp): 5.75905
 Strain Tg03 Genome size (genes): 5463
 NCBI Accession number: GCA_003725665.1

Methods of detection 
Diagnostic procedures using conventional PCR identification have been established due to the detrimental effects this bacterial pathogen can have. Plants infected by phylotype I have been shown to exhibit wilt, necrosis of the stem and visible internal vascular browning. Due to the severity of bacterial wilt in plants, methods of detecting R. pseudosolanacearum concentrations within drain water have been developed.

Virulence studies 
Studies have found that light plays an important role to the colonization of Ralstonia pseudosolanacearum in tomato plants.

References 

Wikipedia Student Program
Burkholderiaceae
Bacterial plant pathogens and diseases